Perithous scurra is a species of ichneumon wasp in the family Ichneumonidae.

Subspecies
These five subspecies belong to the species Perithous scurra:
 Perithous scurra japonicus Uchida, 1928 c g
 Perithous scurra neomexicanus (Viereck, 1903) b
 Perithous scurra nigrinotum Uchida, 1942 c g
 Perithous scurra pleuralis Cresson, 1868 b
 Perithous scurra scurra g
Data sources: i = ITIS, c = Catalogue of Life, g = GBIF, b = Bugguide.net

References

Further reading

External links

 

Pimplinae
Insects described in 1804